St. Aidan's School is the name of multiple schools:

 St Aidan's Anglican Girls' School, Corinda, Queensland, Australia, an independent girls' day school
 St Aidan's C.B.S. (Dublin), Dublin, Ireland, an Irish Christian Brothers secondary school
 St Aidan's Catholic Academy, Ashbrooke, Tyne and Wear, England, a Roman Catholic boys' secondary school and sixth form with academy status
 St Aidan's Church of England High School, Harrogate, North Yorkshirw, England
 Saint Aidan's Church of England High School, Preesall, Lancashire, England
 St Aidan's High School,  Wishaw, North Lanarkshire, Scotland
 St. Aidan's Primary School, a primary school in Wishaw, Scotland

See also
 St Aidan's College, Birkenhead, a former Church of England theological college
 St Aidan's College, Durham, part of the University of Durham
 St Aidan's Academy (disambiguation)